Maurice Lloyd Ayers, sometimes listed as M. S. Ayres, (December 4, 1819 June 11, 1884) was an American banker, farmer, hotelier, and politician from Burlington, Wisconsin, who served a single term as a Free Soil Party member of the Wisconsin State Assembly from Racine County.

Background 
Ayers was born December 4, 1819, in Monroe County, New York. He attended the local public schools until the age of fourteen, when he went to work on a farm for $4 a month.

He went to the Midwest in 1845, landing in Chicago, Illinois, and moving to Rochester, Wisconsin, where he operated a hotel for two years, before moving on to Burlington in the same county, where he purchased another hotel, which he operated until 1852.

On May 5, 1847, he married Luthera Aiken, like himself a native of New York state and of Scottish ancestry. They eventually had seven children, two of whom died in infancy.

Legislature 
Ayers was elected for the 1849 session of the Assembly, the second session of that body since statehood, representing the district consisting of the Racine County Towns of Burlington, Rochester and Yorkville. He succeeded Samuel E. Chapman, a Whig.

In the 1850 session, he was succeeded by Caleb P. Barns, a Democrat also from Burlington.

Later life 
In 1852, Ayers sold his hotel and purchased  in Rochester, which he farmed for about five years. He became a stockholder of the Fox River Valley Railroad and moved back to Burlington to help run it for about a year.

Ayers moved to a new farm in Rochester of  where he lived for the rest of his life. He continued to participate in politics, becoming a member of the Democratic Party, and holding various local offices.

In 1872, he was part of a group of men, including J. I. Case, who founded the Bank of Burlington (which was eventually acquired by Marshall & Ilsley Bank). 
At the time of his death, he was vice-president of the First National Bank of Burlington.

As of 1879, he was one of the owners of the malt house on the east bank of the Fox River in Burlington which was in 1947 converted into the Malt House Theatre. Ayers also owned controlling interest in Burlington's flour mill and considerable real estate investments.

In March 1880, Ayers gave a lot at the corner of Pine and State streets to the local Episcopal congregation, on the condition that a church be built on that lot, failing which the property would revert to the Ayers family. A cornerstone saying "St. John's" was laid in November 1880, but the church was never built, and ownership reverted to the Ayers family. After his death in June 1884, his family members inherited the land.

Death
Ayers died June 11, 1884.

References

External links
 

1819 births
1884 deaths
19th-century American politicians
19th-century American railroad executives
American bankers
American financial company founders
American hoteliers
Businesspeople from New York (state)
Businesspeople from Wisconsin
Corporate executives
Farmers from New York (state)
Farmers from Wisconsin
Democratic Party members of the Wisconsin State Assembly
People from Burlington, Wisconsin
People from Monroe County, New York
Wisconsin Free Soilers
People from Rochester, Wisconsin